Marc Warren is an English television and film actor

Marc Warren may also refer to:

Marc Warren (attorney), assigned to the US Army's Judge Advocate General office
Marc Warren (golfer) (born 1981), Scottish golfer
Marc Warren (soccer) (born 1992), Australian soccer player
Marc Warren (TV producer), American television director, producer and writer

See also
Marco Warren (born 1993), Bermudan international footballer
Mark Warren (disambiguation)